Anacrusis rhizosema is a species of moth of the  family Tortricidae. It is found in Brazil in the states of Santa Catarina and São Paulo.

References

Moths described in 1931
Atteriini
Moths of South America